Cross Township is one of twenty-one current townships in Carroll County, Arkansas, USA. As of the 2010 census, its total population was 284.

Geography

References
 United States Census Bureau 2008 TIGER/Line Shapefiles
 United States Board on Geographic Names (GNIS)
 United States National Atlas

 Census 2010 U.S. Gazetteer Files: County Subdivisions in Arkansas

External links
 US-Counties.com
 City-Data.com

Townships in Carroll County, Arkansas
Townships in Arkansas